Northern Hyperblast Live is a live album by Canadian death metal band Kataklysm. It is the last appearance of singer Sylvain Houde with the band. It also includes the EP Vision the Chaos.

Track listing

Personnel
Sylvain Houde - Vocals
Jean-François Dagenais - Guitars
Maurizio Iacono - Bass
Nick Miller - Drums
Max Duhamel - Drums on "Vision the Chaos (Kataklysm Part I)" and "Shrine of Life"

Kataklysm albums
1998 live albums